847 Agnia is a minor planet orbiting the Sun. It is approximately 28 kilometers in diameter.

The spectrum of this object indicates that it is an S-type asteroid with both low and high calcium forms of pyroxene on the surface, along with less than 20% olivine. The high-calcium form of pyroxene forms 40% or more of the total pyroxene present, indicating a history of igneous rock deposits. This suggests that the asteroid underwent differentiation by melting, creating a surface of basalt rock.

847 Agnia is the namesake of the Agnia family of asteroids that share similar orbital elements and physical properties. The members of this family, including 847 Agnia, most likely formed from the breakup of a basalt object, which in turn was spawned from a larger parent body that had previously undergone igneous differentiation. Other members of this family include 1020 Arcadia, 1228 Scabiosa, 2401 Aehlita, and 3395 Jitka

Photometric observations of this asteroid collected during 2004–2005 show a rotation period of 14.827 ± 0.001 hours with a brightness variation of 0.45 ± 0.03 magnitude.

References

External links 
 Discovery Circumstances: Numbered Minor Planets
 
 

000847
Discoveries by Grigory Neujmin
Named minor planets
000847
000847
19150902